Senza orario Senza bandiera is the debut album by the Italian progressive rock band New Trolls, released in 1968.

The album is considered the first Italian concept album, where seamless, all songs develop a single theme: the vision of the world in the eyes of a poet.
lyrics are by Richard Mannerini and then pass through the hands of Fabrizio De André, who, like a mosaic, (the precise words of De André), assembles them by fitting them in the metric.

The music is all by Nico Di Palo and Vittorio De Scalzi, except Signore, io sono Irish written by Gian Piero Reverberi, who works with the New Trolls on the arrangements, is the author of the short instrumental interludes that connect the songs and is also the producer of the album (with De André), and Vorrei comprare una strada, written by Reverberi with De André, De Scalzi and Di Palo.
Particularly noticeable two tracks: the dreamy Vorrei comprare una strada and the antiwar Ti ricordi, Joe?, Dialogue between two marines veterans.

Track listing

Ho veduto
Vorrei comprare una strada
Signore, io sono Irish
Susy Forrester
Al bar dell'angolo
Duemila
Ti ricordi, Joe?
Padre O'Brien
Tom Flaherty
Andrò ancora

Personnel
 Vittorio De Scalzi - guitar, keyboard, voice
 Nico Di Palo - guitar, voice
 Giorgio D'Adamo - bass
 Gianni Belleno - drums
 Mauro Chiarugi - keyboard

See also
Italian progressive rock
Fabrizio De André

External links
 progarchives.com - commenti all'LP
 viadelcampo.com - testi e commento di Cesare Romana
 Rai International Online - articolo di Luciano Ceri
 barock.it - analisi poetica e musicale dell'album
 La versione originale di Signore, io sono Irish
 I manoscritti di Signore, io sono Irish
 Un viaggio lungo 40 anni, recensione 
  Fabrizio De André parla di Riccardo Mannerini

Notes

1968 albums